Vito Gnutti (14 September 1939 – 6 December 2008) was an Italian politician.

Biography
A member of the Executive Committee of Confindustria, in 1991 Gnutti joined the Northern League. He has been MP from 1992 to 2001 and in 1994 he served as Minister of industry, commerce and craftsmanship in the Berlusconi I Cabinet. He held the position of group leader of the Northern League in the Chamber from 1995 to 1996.

In 1999 Gnutti was expelled from the Northern League, so he founded in 2000, along with Domenico Comino, the ApE; he later joined the European Democracy, of which he was president of the parliamentary group. 

He died in 2008, after a long illness.

References

1939 births
2008 deaths
20th-century Italian politicians
Lega Nord politicians
European Democracy politicians